Evora is a former rural locality in the Barcaldine Region, Queensland, Australia.

On 22 November 2019 the Queensland Government decided to amalgamate the localities in the Barcaldine Region, resulting in five expanded localities based on the larger towns: Alpha, Aramac, Barcaldine, Jericho and Muttaburra. Evora was incorporated into Barcaldine.

Geography 
The Landsborough Highway forms part of the south-western boundary of the locality.

Evora Creek rises in the south-east of the locality and flows through the locality exiting to the north-west (Narbethong), eventually becoming a tributary of the Alice River.

The principal land use is grazing on native vegetation.

History 
The locality takes its name from the pastoral run, which was named by Mr Williams after the residence in St Kilda, Melbourne, of banker Francis Grey Smith, who was Williams' cousin. The house was named after the city of Evora in Portugal.

In October 1892 the Evora wool shed in Evora was destroyed in a fire.

Education 
There are no schools in Evora. The nearest primary and secondary schools are in Barcaldine and Blackall.

References 

Barcaldine Region
Unbounded localities in Queensland